Dheepam is a 1977 Indian Tamil-language film, directed by  K. Vijayan and produced by K. Balaji. The film stars Sivaji Ganesan, Sujatha, Vijayakumar and Sangeetha. It is a remake of the Malayalam film Theekkanal. The film was released on 26 January 1977, and ran for over 100 days in theatres.

Plot 
Somu and Kannan are brothers. During a small fight, Somu injures Kannan and believing him to be dead runs away. He joins Raja, the elder as his adopted son and becomes a smuggler. Before dying, the father hands over everything he has to Somu, now Raja, including his daughter Latha for him to take care. However, due to their shady business, he is unable to find a groom for her.

Radha is Latha's friend and Raja is in love with her. She however shuns him for the same reason as others. They both meet Kannan and take a liking to him. Soon, Raja realizes Kannan is his brother and showers love and riches on him. When he finds out Radha and Kannan are in love, he solemnizes their marriage too. However, soon, Radha and Kannan start to suspect Raja's true intentions driving Kannan to drinking. Unable to declare the true relationship between Kannan and him as it would ruin the life of his sister who absolutely believes that he is everything in addition to him giving his word that he will never reveal that he is not her brother to their father, he takes on all the abuse. In the end, he kills himself to solve all problems asking Kannan to arrange for Latha's marriage.

Cast 
Sivaji Ganesan as Raja / Somu
Sujatha as Radha
Vijayakumar as Kannan
Sangeetha as Latha
K. Balaji as Photographer
Padmini as Kannan's mother (Guest Appearance)
Sathyapriya as Asha
Major Sundarrajan as Raja
S. V. Subbaiah as Ramaiya
S. V. Ramadas as Vasu
Nagesh as Rahim Bai
Suruli Rajan as karups
Manorama as Rama
Sachu as Palakadu Bama
Y. G. Mahendran

Soundtrack 
The music was composed by Ilaiyaraaja, with lyrics by Pulamaipithan. The song "Anthapurathil Oru" is set in Mayamalavagowla raga, and "Poovizhi Vaasalil" is set in Yamunakalyani.

Reception 
Kanthan of Kalki praised the performances of Ganesan and other actors and Vijayan's direction but felt the comedy sequences of Manorama were unnecessary.

References

Bibliography

External links 
 

1970s Tamil-language films
1977 films
Films directed by K. Vijayan
Films scored by Ilaiyaraaja
Tamil remakes of Malayalam films